Costa Magica is a , owned by Seajets, a Greek/Cypriot ferry company, and previously operated by Costa Crociere. Costa Magica pays homage to some of the most famous destinations in Italy including Positano, Portofino, Bellagio, and Sicily which are all incorporated into her public rooms and restaurants. At , she was one of the largest ships in the Costa Crociere fleet.

Design and description

This later increased to 102,784 GT and 9,859 DWT.

The ship is powered by two diesel engines turning two fixed pitch propellers creating . Ward states the ship has two azimuth thruster pods. The vessel is also equipped with seven electric generating sets creating .

The cruise ship has capacity for 2,718 passengers and has a crew of 1,068. There is a nine-deck atrium with a bar on the lowest level, a  spa and a three-deck theatre.

Construction and career

The ship was constructed by Fincantieri in Genoa, Italy with the yard number 6087. The vessel's keel was laid down on 1 September 2002 and launched in November 2003. The vessel was completed on 26 October 2004 and entered service in November of that year. The vessel was owned and operated by Costa Crociere and was registered in Genoa.

2020 COVID-19 pandemic

On 12 March 2020, two passengers aboard were reported to have tested positive for COVID-19 while quarantined in Martinique. The ship, with 3,300 people on board, had been disallowed entry to several sea ports including Grenada, Tobago, Barbados and Saint Lucia, due to over 300 Italian nationals on board. On 16 March, the ship was allowed only to take on provisions and refuel at St. Maarten with no one allowed to leave the ship.

It was later reported that passengers from the ship disembarked in mid-March leaving just the crew aboard. On 30 March, those who tested negative were taken to the airport and put aboard charter flights to repatriate them to their home nations. Those who tested positive remained aboard the ships, which then sailed for Europe.

An update by CNN on 3 April 2020 stated the ship remained near Miami after "six crew members with respiratory symptoms were evacuated from the ship, and then transported to a hospital". The Port of Miami had not provided consent for the vessel to dock but all passengers had previously disembarked at Guadeloupe.

Transfer to Carnival Cruise Line
On 23 June 2021, it was announced that Costa Magica would be rebranded and transferred to the Carnival fleet in mid-2022, and would most likely join the Sunshine-class.

Sale to Seajets
On 8 February 2023, it was announced that Costa Magica was sold to Seajets, a Greek/Cypriot ferry company.

Notes

Citations

References

External links

 Official website
 Costa Magica current position

2003 ships
Ships built by Fincantieri
Ships built in Genoa
Cruise ships involved in the COVID-19 pandemic
Ships of Costa Cruises